Beats & Bruises is the fifth studio album by Swedish singer-songwriter Miss Li, released on 16 March 2011.

Track listing
 Devil's Taken Her Man
 I Can't Get You Off My Mind
 My Man
 Shoot Me
 You Could Have It (So Much Better Without Me)
 Forever Drunk
 Hit It
 Arrested
 Billy's Got A Gun
 Modern Family
 Are You Happy Now

Charts

References

2011 albums
Miss Li albums